Stuart Bernard Redfern (born  in Leicester) is an English retired rugby union player who played in the 1980s and 1990s. He played 324 games for Leicester Tigers between 1982–1992 and played for an England XV against a Rest of the World XV in 1984, his position was loosehead prop. He retired from Leicester in 1992. He was later a member of the Tigers' coaching team and coach of Coalville RFC.  His older brother is Steve Redfern, with whom he started 45 times for Leicester.

References

External links
ESPN

1961 births
Living people
English rugby union players
Leicester Tigers players
Rugby union props
Rugby union players from Leicester